Little Uvas Creek is a perennial stream in southwest Santa Clara County, California, United States.  The headwaters rise on the northeastern flank of  Loma Chiquita Ridge in the Santa Cruz mountains, and flow eastward, eventually merging with Uvas Creek.

Little Uvas Road follows alongside the creek for most of its length, ending at the intersection with Uvas Road.

See also
 Riparian zone

References

Rivers of Santa Clara County, California
Rivers of Northern California